The Togo women's national volleyball team represents Togo in international women's volleyball competitions and friendly matches.

It took part in the 2014 FIVB Volleyball Women's World Championship qualification.

References

External links
Togo Volleyball Federation

National women's volleyball teams
Volleyball
Volleyball in Togo
Women's sport in Togo